Jonny Woo is a British comedian, actor, and drag queen. He co-owns The Glory, an East London pub in which he regularly performs.

Woo spent time in New York City between 2000 and 2003, where he performed at a downtown club and was prominent on the burlesque scene. He returned to London, where he created events and became known for massive parties. He has toured the world with solo and group shows and had residencies at the Soho Theatre, ICA, Bistrotheque. He's also created events for The Royal Opera House, The Royal National Theatre, The London Coliseum, and The Hackney Empire, as well as for media and corporate companies including MTV and Selfridges. His party, Gay Bingo, was established in 2003 and changed the face of London's drag scene, bringing in a new generation of "alt drag," "East London drag," or "nu-drag." Since then, he has devised numerous shows as well as opened his own venue, The Glory, in East London, which he also tours festivals with. Woo is a founding member of Glastonbury's drag scene at NYC Downlow.

Training 
Woo, born Jonathan Wooster, trained at the University of Birmingham in Drama and Theatre Arts and at London Contemporary Dance School. He went on to continue training in dance in New York where he performed with Julia Ritter Performance Group.

Career
Woo began performing as a cabaret artist at The Slipper Room on the new burlesque scene with performance artist Brandon Olson, where they developed material that later became the show "Go-Go Real" at Dixon Place. They went on to perform for a season in Provincetown and created a second show for Dixon Place inspired by the events of 9/11. As a solo artist, Woo developed "The Mummy Project," a series of installations in the windows of performance space Chashama on 42nd Street, also a response to 9/11.

Woo created and hosted Radio Egypt with the landlord of The George and Dragon, Richard Battye, in 2003, which ran at the pub, then the 291 Gallery, until December of that year.

In 2004, Woo began an 8-year residency at Bistrotheque, a restaurant, bar, and cabaret venue. He hosted the "Tranny Talent" and "Tranny Lip-Synching" competitions and went on to develop performance art, cabaret, and multi-media shows for the space. The competition still exists, is held annually at The Glory, and was renamed LIPSYNC1000 in 2014. About 150 drag queens enter LIPSYNC1000 each year.

Woo was instrumental in bringing drag to Glastonbury as part of the first gay tent at the "NNYC Downlow" festival. From 2008 to 2011, he led and directed around 30 drag artists as part of this New York-inspired installation and club.

Following the closure of Bistrotheque's cabaret room, Woo began working with Hoi Polloi at the Ace Hotel in Shoreditch on projects such as the Miss Hoi Polloi pageant.

Various gay bingo revivals occurred, including 2012 and 2014 gay bingo boat parties on the Thames.  Woo accepted a two-year Friday night residency at the Hippodrome, London, where he hosted the cabaret room.

Having quit drugs a few years before following a near-death experience [5], Woo wrote a show about the "unconscious explosion of Shoreditch in the 90s" called The East London Lecture, which he later performed in the autumn at the Rose Lipman Building in Haggerston.

Across the summer of 2014, Woo devised a Lou Reed tribute show originally called (TRANS)former, which he performed with a live band at Latitude Festival. The show appeared in 2015 at Glastonbury Festival as well as a ten-night run at the Edinburgh Fringe. The show then had a residency at the Soho Theatre in September 2015.

Woo devised a side project show with his friend, the operatic drag queen Le Gateau Chocolat, called A Night at the Musicals, which has appeared at festivals and events. Woo began working with East London Session Players in 2015 and has appeared as the lead in two theatre productions, adaptations of Suddenly Last Summer and The Tell-Tale Heart.

in 2016 devised a show responding to Brexit called "Jonny Woo's All Star Brexit," written with Jerry Springer. The opera's composer, Richard Thomas, and the show enjoyed an Edinburgh Festival run.

Woo also created "Jonny Woo's Un-Royal Variety," a major alternative drag and cabaret variety show at Hackney Empire.

Following the cancellation of the Eurovision Song Contest 2020, Woo hosted "Attitude and Netflix’s BIG Eurovision Song Contest Quiz" alongside Juno Dawson.

The Glory 
In 2010, Woo began hunting for a site in East London to open his own bar. Together with TV director Colin Rothbart, bar manager Zoe Argiros, and Gay Bingo drag partner John Sizzle, the four took over the former site of the Paradise Inn on Kingsland Road in Haggerston. Described as a "queer haunt, nightlife spot, and performance mecca," the pub re-opened as The Glory in December 2014.

Woo launched a comedy night at The Glory with comedian Jayde Adams. This was later replaced by a gay sketch comedy troupe, The Sex Shells, to whom Woo gave a residency to.

Victoria Coren Mitchell visited The Glory and interviewed Woo as part of the BBC Four documentary series "How To Be Bohemian." In the program, Coren Mitchell states, "This is the kind of bohemian I could get behind."

References

External links 
 Timeout interview
 This is Jonny Woo
 Interview
 Latest features

Living people
British comedians
English drag queens
Alumni of the University of Birmingham
Year of birth missing (living people)